Mack Tuck (born February 21, 1975) is a retired American basketball player and current coach born in Mineola, Texas. He was the head coach of the Japanese team Rizing Fukuoka of the bj league in 2013.

Coaching career
From 2009 till 2011 Tuck was assistant coach for the Shandong Lions of the CBA. In August 2013, the Japanese bj league team Rizing Fukuoka hired Tuck as their new head coach. In June 2017, Tuck became an assistant coach of Qingdao DoubleStar.

Head coaching record

|- 
| style="text-align:left;"|Rizing Fukuoka
| style="text-align:left;"|2013
| 0||0||0||||Fired |||-||-||-||
| style="text-align:center;"|-
|-

References

1975 births
Living people
American expatriate basketball people in Bulgaria
American expatriate basketball people in China
American expatriate basketball people in Portugal
American expatriate basketball people in the Dominican Republic
American expatriate basketball people in the Netherlands
American expatriate basketball people in Venezuela
Basketball players from Texas
Donar (basketball club) players
Central Oklahoma Bronchos men's basketball players
Cocodrilos de Caracas players
Colorado Buffaloes men's basketball players
Dutch Basketball League players
People from Mineola, Texas
Shandong Hi-Speed Kirin players
Small forwards
American men's basketball players